Modesty Blaise is a comic strip character created by Peter O'Donnell.

Modesty Blaise may also refer to:

 Modesty Blaise (novel), the 1965 novel by O'Donnell
 Modesty Blaise (1966 film), a 1966 film based upon the comic strip
 Modesty Blaise (1982 film), a 1982 made-for-television film based upon the character
 My Name Is Modesty, a 2003 direct-to-DVD film based upon the character

See also
 "Modesty Plays", a song by Sparks on the album Music That You Can Dance To
 Immodesty Blaize, a burlesque dancer